Wacker Chemie AG is a  German multinational chemical company which was founded in 1914 by Alexander Wacker. The company is controlled by the Wacker family holding more than 50 percent of the shares. The corporation is operating more than 25 production sites in Europe, Asia, and the Americas. 

The product range includes silicone rubbers, polymer products like ethylene vinyl acetate redispersible polymer powder, chemical materials, polysilicon and wafers for the semiconductor industry. The company sells its products in more than 100 countries. As of 31 December 2015, 16,972 employees have been with Wacker. Corporate annual sales in 2015, were about 5,3 billion Euros, up 10% compared to 2014.

The biggest production site of Wacker Chemie is the Burghausen plant in the south-east of Bavaria, Germany, with about 10,000 employees. The US headquarters was previously located in Adrian, Michigan. In 2022, Wacker opened a new US headquarters in Ann Arbor, Michigan.

Business activity 
Wacker Chemie AG – divided into 5 divisions – derives most of its products from two main raw materials: silicon and ethylene. Siltronic supplies the semi-conductor market with wafers.

Wacker Polysilicon produces hyper-pure electronic-grade polysilicon for use in electronic and solar wafers. Wacker Silicones serves end markets like construction, automobile, paints, textiles, and paper. 

Wacker Polymers starting with ethylene serves mainly the construction industry with redispersible powders and several other industries with dispersions. Wacker Biosolutions focuses on using bio-technological processes to serve its customers. Wacker Polymers, a division of Wacker Chemie AG has appointed Peter Summo (48) as its next president, effective 1 October. Summo previously headed the engineering silicones business unit at Wacker Silicones. He is succeeding Arno von der Eltz, who is retiring on this date.

Wacker Chemie in the United States

Tennessee polysilicon operations
In early 2009, Wacker announced plans to construct a new solar-grade polysilicon production facility in Charleston, a small city in Bradley County, Tennessee. Groundbreaking occurred on April 8, 2011, and the plant became operational in April 2016, costing approximately US$2.5 billion and making it the largest-ever single private investment in the state of Tennessee. In June 2017, a US$150 million secondary expansion was announced that would allow the plant to manufacture pyrogenic silica. This expansion was completed in October 2019, adding 50 new jobs to the plant.

Safety issues and incidents
In October 2012, two subcontract workers fell to their death resulting in a temporary suspension of construction activities. The subcontracting company was later found to be at fault.
A Tennessee Occupational and Safety Administration (TOSHA) inspection conducted in March 2016 resulted in a fine of US$3,500 for regulatory violations over the control of hazardous energy.
A second TOSHA inspection conducted in August 2016, resulted in a fine of US$4,000 for issues stemming from process safety and respiratory equipment.
On August 30, 2017, 5 workers were hospitalized with chemical burns following a discharge of Silane gas within the plant.
On November 13, 2020, at approximately 10:15 am, five workers were injured in an incident described as an "industrial accident" involving a small release of hydrochloric acid and steam. One of the workers died from his injuries later that day.

2017 explosion and aftermath
On September 7, 2017, a massive explosion in the plant's hydrogen recovery unit resulted in the release of a steam cloud which could be seen for several miles, as well as the environmental release of low-concentration hydrochloric acid. Due to initial concerns about the composition of the cloud, local officials closed a section of I-75 between nearby Cleveland and Calhoun, as well as nearby State Route 308 in Charleston. During the event, seven local residents, and a plant worker were transported to a local hospital with unspecified injuries. A firefighter and four sheriff's deputies were also treated for heat-related symptoms and later released. The following day, officials from TOSHA announced a temporary shutdown of the plant pending investigation. Five days later, an environmental sensor detected elevated levels of an unnamed substance prompting a shelter-in-place order for emergency workers involved in cleanup efforts within the facility.

During the explosion event, local officials instructed residents to shelter indoors with their windows closed and HVAC systems turned off. Nearby residents complained of respiratory distress, as well as an odd taste in their mouths. This led to speculation in both local and social media that the cloud contained high-concentration hydrochloric acid, despite media reports to the contrary. For the week following the event, there was little-to-no communication from Wacker management or government officials, resulting in further speculation about hazardous chemicals being released into the environment. Wacker management later issued a full-page letter stating that no hazardous chemicals were released. One and a half weeks later, Bradley County Emergency Management Agency Director Troy Spence held a press-conference attempting to allay fears, and urging residents to sign up for the county's non-emergency text-messaging service.

Plastics manufacturing 
At the end of 2007, Wacker took over vinyl acetate/ethylene operations from Air Products Polymers. Consequently, it took full ownership of the activities in Allentown, Pennsylvania, and Calvert City, Kentucky.

Headquarters

Wacker's US headquarters are located in Adrian, Michigan – where Wacker Chemical Corporation is producing Silicon materials.

Wacker global 
The regions which Wacker has distributors and sale offices are as below:
 Middle East and Africa
 Greater China
 South Korea
 North America
 Russia and CIS
 India
 South America
 Southeast Asia
 Turkey
 Europe
 Japan

Wacker production sites 
Wacker has many production sites across the world in the Americas, Europe, and Asia. There are directly 13,500 employees in these continents which work for Wacker productions network.

Europe sites
 Burghausen
 Cologne
 Halle
 Holla
 Jena
 León
 Nuenchritz
 Pilsen
 Stetten
 Amsterdam

America sites
 Adrian
 Calvert City
 Charleston
 Chino
 Eddyville
 Jandira
 North Canton

Asia sites
 Jincheon
 Kolkata
 Nanjing
 Shunde
 Ulsan
 Tsukuba
 Zhangjiagang

References

External links

Chemical companies of Germany
German companies established in 1914
Chemical companies established in 1914
German brands
IG Farben
Manufacturing companies based in Munich
Silicon wafer producers
Multinational companies headquartered in Germany